Rosenheim is an electoral constituency (German: Wahlkreis) represented in the Bundestag. It elects one member via first-past-the-post voting. Under the current constituency numbering system, it is designated as constituency 222. It is located in southern Bavaria, comprising the city of Rosenheim and the Landkreis Rosenheim district.

Rosenheim was created for the inaugural 1949 federal election. Since 2005, it has been represented by Daniela Ludwig of the Christian Social Union (CSU).

Geography
Rosenheim is located in southern Bavaria. As of the 2021 federal election, it comprises the independent city of Rosenheim and the district of Landkreis Rosenheim.

History
Rosenheim was created in 1949. In the 1949 election, it was Bavaria constituency 10 in the numbering system. In the 1953 through 1961 elections, it was number 205. In the 1965 through 1976 elections, it was number 210. In the 1980 through 1998 elections, it was number 209. In the 2002 and 2005 elections, it was number 224. In the 2009 and 2013 elections, it was number 223. Since the 2017 election, it has been number 222.

Originally, the constituency comprised the independent city of Rosenheim and the districts of Landkreis Rosenheim, Bad Aibling, and Ebersberg. In the 1976 election, it comprised the city of Rosenheim and the districts of Landkreis Rosenheim and Ebersberg. It acquired its current borders in the 1980 election.

Members
The constituency has been held by the Christian Social Union (CSU) during all but one Bundestag term since its creation. It was first represented by Hugo Decker of the Bavaria Party (BP) from 1949 to 1953. Ludwig Franz of the CSU won it in 1953 and served until 1976. He was succeeded by Hans Graf Huyn, who was representative until 1987. Wolfgang Zeitlmann then served from 1987 to 2005. Daniela Ludwig was elected in 2005, and re-elected in 2009, 2013, 2017, and 2021.

Election results

2021 election

2017 election

2013 election

2009 election

References

Federal electoral districts in Bavaria
1949 establishments in West Germany
Constituencies established in 1949
Rosenheim
Rosenheim (district)